Temósachic is a town and seat of the municipality of Temósachic, in the northern Mexican state of Chihuahua. As of 2010, the town of Temósachic had a population of 1,841, up from 1,786 as of 2005.

Climate

References

Notes

Populated places in Chihuahua (state)